Cristina Tisot married Arrigoni (born 23 August 1954) is a former Italian World Cup alpine ski racer who was 6th in downhill at the World Ski Championships 1974.

Biography
Cristina Tisot had a short but intense skiing career which ended prematurely due to injury, at the age of only 22, on the eve of the 1976 Winter Olympics in which she would have participated. In 1973 she married her coach Franco Arrigoni.

World Cup results

Race podiums
1 podiums - (1 GS)

World Championship results

National titles
In her short career Tisot has won two national titles.

Italian Alpine Ski Championships
Slalom: 1974
Giant slalom: 1975

References

External links
 
 Cristina Tisot at Skisport365

1954 births
Living people
Italian female alpine skiers